Gunnarsbyn is a village located in Boden Municipality, Sweden, at Råne River, 70 km north of Luleå and almost 45 km north of Boden.

References and sources

www.boden.se/

Populated places in Boden Municipality
Norrbotten